Mellony Geugjes (born ) is a Dutch female kickboxer and mixed martial artist, based in Amsterdam, Netherlands. She has competed professionally since 2009 and is the current ISKA Featherweight champion which she won by defeating Dilara Yildiz.

Mixed Martial Arts

The Ultimate Fighter
In April 2016, it was announced that Geugjes would be a contestant on The Ultimate Fighter: Team Joanna vs. Team Cláudia. She was defeated by Amanda Cooper in the opening qualifying round.

Championships and awards

ISKA
2014 – ISKA World Featherweight Title (56 kg)

K-1
 2017 Krush Women's Flyweight Championship

Kickboxing record 

|- style="background:#fbb;"
|2017-12-09
| style="text-align:center;"|Loss
|align=left| KANA
|Krush 83
| Tokyo, Japan
| style="text-align:center;"|Decision (Unanimous)
|align=center|3
|align=center|3:00
| style="text-align:center;"|
|-
! style=background:white colspan=9 |
|- style="background:#cfc;"
|2017-05-13
| style="text-align:center;"|Win
|align=left| Feride Kirat
| 
|Netherlands
| style="text-align:center;"|Decision
|align=center|3
|align=center|3:00
| style="text-align:center;"|23-8-3
|-
|- style="background:#cfc;"
|2017-03-15
| style="text-align:center;"|Win
|align=left| Momi
|Krush.75
| Tokyo, Japan
| style="text-align:center;"|Decision
|align=center|3
|align=center|3:00
| style="text-align:center;"|
|-
! style=background:white colspan=9 |
|- style="background:#cfc;"
|2017-01-15
| style="text-align:center;"|Win
|align=left| KANA
|Krush 72
| Tokyo, Japan
| style="text-align:center;"|Decision (Unanimous)
|align=center|3
|align=center|3:00
| style="text-align:center;"|
|-
! style=background:white colspan=9 |
|-
|- style="background:#fbb;"
|2015-11-21
| style="text-align:center;"|Loss
|align=left| Lorena Klijn	
|Enfusion Live 34
| Groningen, Netherlands
| style="text-align:center;"|Ext.R Decision
|align=center|4
|align=center|2:00
| style="text-align:center;"|
|-

|-
|- style="background:#fbb;"
|2015-07-04
| style="text-align:center;"|Loss
|align=left| Lucia Krajčovič
|Hanuman Cup 27
| Senec, Slovakia
| style="text-align:center;"|Decision
|align=center|3
|align=center|3:00
| style="text-align:center;"|
|-
|- style="background:#fbb;"
|2015-06-20
| style="text-align:center;"|Loss
|align=left| Jleana Valentino	
| 
| 
| style="text-align:center;"|Decision
|align=center|5
|align=center|3:00
| style="text-align:center;"|
|-
! style=background:white colspan=9 |

|- style="background:#fbb;"
|2015-11-10
| style="text-align:center;"|Loss
|align=left| Julia Irmen
| 
| Munich, Germany
| style="text-align:center;"|Decision
|align=center|3
|align=center|3:00
| style="text-align:center;"|
|-
! style=background:white colspan=9 |
|- style="background:#fbb;"
|2014-12-06
| style="text-align:center;"|Loss
|align=left| Grace Spicer
| 
| Amsterdam, Netherlands
| style="text-align:center;"|Decision (unanimous)
|align=center|3
|align=center|3:00
| style="text-align:center;"|
|-
|- style="background:#cfc;"
|2014-10-04
| style="text-align:center;"|Win
|align=left| Dilara Yildiz
| 
| Merseburg, Germany
| style="text-align:center;"|Decision
|align=center|3
|align=center|3:00
| style="text-align:center;"|
|-
! style=background:white colspan=9 |
|- style="background:#cfc;"
|2012-10-13
| style="text-align:center;"|Win
|align=left| Jenny Krigsman
|Supremacy League Rising
| Netherlands
| style="text-align:center;"|Decision
|align=center|3
|align=center|3:00
| style="text-align:center;"|
|-
|- style="background:#fbb;"
|2012-03-12
| style="text-align:center;"|Loss
|align=left| Marianna Kalergi
| 
| Netherlands 
| style="text-align:center;"|KO
|align=center|
|align=center|
| style="text-align:center;"|
|-
|- style="background:#fbb;"
|2011-11-27
| style="text-align:center;"|Loss
|align=left| Alexis Rufus
|Stars Fight Night
|  London, England
| style="text-align:center;"|Decision (unanimous)
|align=center|5
|align=center|2:00
| style="text-align:center;"|
|-
|- style="background:#fbb;"
|2011-11-12
| style="text-align:center;"|Loss
|align=left| Jemyma Betrian
| 
|  Philipsburg, Sint Maarten
| style="text-align:center;"|Decision
|align=center|3
|align=center|3:00
| style="text-align:center;"|
|-
|-
| colspan=9 | Legend:

Mixed martial arts record

|-
| Loss
| align=center| 3–8
| Manon Fiorot
| TKO (punches)
| EFC Worldwide 80
| 
| align=center| 3
| align=center| 4:17
| Sibaya, South Africa
| 
|-
| Win
| align=center| 3–7
| Naomi Tataroglu
| Decision (unanimous)
| Team Spirit 8
| 
| align=center| 2
| align=center| 5:00
| Beverwijk, Netherlands
| 
|-
| Loss
| align=center| 2–7
| Griet Eeckhout
| Decision (unanimous)
| Strength & Honor Championship 14
| 
| align=center| 3
| align=center| 5:00
| Dessel, Belgium
| For the SHC Flyweight Championship
|-
| Loss
| align=center| 2–6
| Stephanie Ielö Page
| Decision (unanimous)
| 100% Fight 36
| 
| align=center| 3
| align=center| 5:00
| Paris, France
| For the 100% Fight Bantamweight Championship  
|-
| Loss
| align=center| 2–5
| Bo Meng
| Decision (unanimous)
| Glory of Heroes 31
| 
| align=center| 3
| align=center| 5:00
| Beijing, China
| 
|-
| Loss
| align=center| 2–4
| Eva Dourthe
| Decision (unanimous)
| European Beatdown 3
| 
| align=center| 3
| align=center| 5:00
| Mons, Belgium
| 
|-
| Win
| align=center| 2–3
| Christina Stelliou
| Submission (rear-naked choke)
| Spartacus Fighting Championships 5
| 
| align=center| 3
| align=center| 2:17
| Sofia, Bulgaria
| 
|-
| Win
| align=center| 1–3
| Judith Levi
| Decision (split)
| Contenders Norwich 16
| 
| align=center| 3
| align=center| 5:00
| Norwich, Norfolk, England
| 
|-
| Loss
| align=center| 0–3
| Bryony Tyrell
| Decision (unanimous)
| British Challenge MMA 16
| 
| align=center| 3
| align=center| 5:00
| Colchester, Essex, England
| For the BCMMA Strawweight Championship
|-
| Loss
| align=center| 0–2
| Montana Stewart
| Decision (unanimous)
| SCC Preserving the Arts
| 
| align=center| 3
| align=center| 5:00
| Fort Worth, Texas
| 
|-
| Loss
| align=center| 0–1
| Dora Perjes
| Submission (armbar)
| Croatian MMA League: Superfinals 2013
| 
| align=center| 1
| align=center| 0:50
| Zagreb, Croatia
| 
|-

References

External links

 Official Krush profile
 Mellony Geugjes at Awakening Fighters

1992 births
Living people
Dutch female mixed martial artists
Dutch female kickboxers
Female Muay Thai practitioners
Strawweight mixed martial artists
Flyweight mixed martial artists
Mixed martial artists utilizing boxing
Mixed martial artists utilizing Muay Thai
Dutch women boxers
Dutch Muay Thai practitioners
Sportspeople from Amsterdam
Featherweight kickboxers